Nationality words link to articles with information on the nation's poetry or literature (for instance, Irish or France).

Events

Works published

Great Britain
 Philip Ayres, Emblems of Love, later reissued under the title Cupids Addresse to the Ladies
 John Chalkhill, Thealma and Clearchus: A pastoral history, posthumously published; edited by Izaak Walton
 Thomas D'Urfey, A New Collection of Songs and Poems
 Thomas Flatman, On the Death of the Illustrious Prince Rupert, Prince Rupert died November 29 of this year
 Robert Gould, Presbytery Rough-Drawn, published anonymously
 John Mason, Spiritual Songs; or, Songs of Praise to Almighty God upon Several Occasions, published anonymously
 John Oldham, Poems, and Translations
 Thomas Shipman, Carolina; or, Loyal Poems

Other
 Benjamin Keach, Sion in Distress, or The Groans of the Protestant Church, English Colonial America
 Emilie Juliane of Schwarzburg-Rudolstadt, Geistliche Lieder [...], German hymns; published in Rudolstadt

Births
Death years link to the corresponding "[year] in poetry" article:
 March 1 – Tsangyang Gyatso, 6th Dalai Lama (died 1706), Indian-born Monpa Buddhist religious leader and Tibetan poet
 May 20 – Elijah Fenton (died 1730), English poet
 July 3 – Edward Young (died 1765), English poet

Deaths
Birth years link to the corresponding "[year] in poetry" article:
 December 9 – John Oldham (born 1653), English satirical poet and translator
 Katherine Austen (born 1629), English diarist and poet

See also

 Poetry
 17th century in poetry
 17th century in literature
 Restoration literature

Notes

17th-century poetry
Poetry